The World Cup of Crisps is a Twitter survey created and organised by British television host Richard Osman, to determine the United Kingdom's favourite brand and flavour of crisps. The competition takes place every four years, with the inaugural competition running during February and March 2012.

History 
The World Cup of Crisps was originally conceived on social media by Osman in January 2012. The inaugural edition had 32 types of crisp, with eight group winners qualifying for the quarter-finals, and the competition progressing further using a knockout system. Votes were cast on Twitter using the hashtag #wcocr. The second edition was expanded to include 48 types of crisp and three group stages before semi-finals and a final, and votes were cast using Twitter's new poll feature.

Results

2012 World Cup of Crisps 
Due to the lack of Twitter polls, no official numbers of votes were revealed in the first edition of the World Cup of Crisps.

Group stages 
Entries in bold denote crisps that qualified for the knockout stages.

Knockout stage

2016 World Cup of Crisps 
The second edition began on Saturday 26 March and is set to conclude on Monday 28 March. The new Twitter poll feature automatically tallied the results, and during the semi-finals over one million votes had been cast.

First Group Stage 
The 48 crisps were drawn into twelve groups of four, with the top two from each group progressing to the second group stage. Bold indicates crisps that qualified.

Group 1

Group 2

Group 3

Group 4

Due to the tie between Walkers Smoky Bacon and Taytos Cheese & Onion, a 10-minute tiebreak poll was conducted, with Walkers defeating Taytos by 51% to 49%.

Group 5

Group 6

Group 7

Group 8

Group 9

Group 10

Group 11

Group 12

Second Group Stage 
The 24 remaining crisps were then re-drawn into six groups of four, with the top two qualifying for a third group stage. Bold indicates crisps that qualified.

Group 1

Group 2

Group 3

Group 4

Group 5

Group 6

Quarter-Final Stage 
The 12 remaining crisps were then drawn into four groups of three, with just the group winners progressing to the semi-finals. Bold indicates crisps that proceeded.

Quarter-Final 1

Quarter-Final 2

This result saw defending champions Frazzles eliminated.

Quarter-Final 3

Quarter-Final 4

Knockout stages

Controversy 
During and after the second edition of the event, several voters became disillusioned with the choice of crisps on offer. A debate began to emerge on the definition of the word crisp, with three of the four semi-finalists, Wotsits, Monster Munch and Quavers, as well as the 2012 winners Frazzles, being criticised for not conforming to some definitions of the snack. Osman invited those who doubted the validity of the winner to organise their own World Cup.

References

British snack foods